This is a list of electoral division results for the 2019 Australian federal election in the state of South Australia.

Overall results

Results by division

Adelaide

Barker

Boothby

Grey

Hindmarsh

Kingston

Makin

Mayo

Spence

Sturt

References

2019 Australian federal election
South Australia 2019